Miguel Droguett (born 8 May 1961) is a Chilean former cyclist. He competed at the 1984 Summer Olympics and the 1992 Summer Olympics.

References

External links
 

1961 births
Living people
Chilean male cyclists
Olympic cyclists of Chile
Cyclists at the 1984 Summer Olympics
Cyclists at the 1992 Summer Olympics
Sportspeople from Santiago
Pan American Games medalists in cycling
Pan American Games bronze medalists for Chile
Cyclists at the 1991 Pan American Games
Medalists at the 1991 Pan American Games
20th-century Chilean people
21st-century Chilean people